In taxonomy, Sulfophobococcus is a genus of the Desulfurococcaceae.

References

Further reading

Scientific journals

Scientific books

Scientific databases

External links

Archaea genera
Thermoproteota